Referendums held in 1979 were:

1979 Scottish devolution referendum
1979 Welsh devolution referendum
March 1979 Iranian Islamic Republic referendum
1979 Irish constitutional referendums